Chestertown Historic District is a national historic district located at Chestertown, Warren County, New York.  It includes seven contributing buildings. It includes the Fowler Homestead and related outbuildings, the Church of the Good Shepherd (1884, addition 1954), Chester Town Hall, the Fowler cemetery, and centennial monument (1913).  The Fowler Homestead is a Greek Revival style home constructed in the mid-1840s.

It was added to the National Register of Historic Places in 1977.

References

Historic districts on the National Register of Historic Places in New York (state)
Greek Revival architecture in New York (state)
Historic districts in Warren County, New York
National Register of Historic Places in Warren County, New York